Chu Yupu (1887–1929) was a Chinese general who served under Yuan Shikai and later Zhang Zongchang. In 1921 he entered the service of Fengtian Province warlord Zhang Zuolin. He first fought against Sun Yat-sen's Kuomintang forces in August 1913. He became leader of the Fengtian clique's Zhili Army and military governor of Zhili province in 1926. During the Northern Expedition he fought against the Guominjun forces of Feng Yuxiang and the National Revolutionary Army of Chiang Kai-shek. In March 1929, he was captured by his former subordinate Liu Zhennian and executed by firing squad on September 4, 1929.

1887 births
1929 deaths
Executed military personnel
Republic of China warlords from Shandong
Executed Republic of China people
People executed by the Republic of China by firing squad
People from Jining